FK Oq-Tepa (() is Uzbekistani football club based in Tashkent. Currently it plays in Uzbekistan First League.

History
The club was founded in 2000. Oqtepa played until 2005 in Uzbekistan Second League in Tashkent league. In the same year club won Tashkent League and promoted to First League.In 2006 club made its debut in First League, finishing the season at 11th position. The 2014 season club played in First League, zone "East". The club finished the season at 4th position after Promotion round which club's best standing in First League ever. In 2014 Uzbekistan Cup Oqtepa reached quarter-final of tournament and lost to Pakhtakor by 2:12 in two leg competition, winning by the way NBU Osiyo, Mash'al Mubarek and Hotira-79 in Round of 16. It is the best club performance in Cup matches.

League history

In 2010–2014 seasons the league position and match statistics after Promotion round is given where club qualified.

Managers

 Rustam Khamdamov (2000–2005)
 Nizom Nortojiev, Otabek Mansurov (2006)
 Otabek Mansurov (2007)
 Ravil Imamov (2008)
 Alexander Mochinov (2010–2011)
 Vokhid Holboev (2012)
 Farkhod Abdurasulov (2012)
 Vladimir Anikin (2013– February 2014)
 Alexander Mochinov (February 2014– June 2014)
 Furkat Esonboev (June 2014– )

References

External links
 FC Oqtepa Official Website
 FC Oqtepa matches and results at soccerway.com

Football clubs in Uzbekistan
2000 establishments in Uzbekistan